George Hancock may refer to:

 George Hancock (Virginia politician) (1754–1820), U.S. Congressman from Virginia
 George Hancock (Royal Navy officer) (1819–1876), Commander-in-Chief, Pacific Station
 George Hancock (softball) (fl. 1880s), Chicago inventor of softball
 George Hancock (architect) (1849–1924), active in North Dakota, Montana, Minnesota
 George Allan Hancock (1875–1965), owner of the Rancho La Brea Oil Company
 George Hancock (footballer) (1931–2010), Australian rules footballer